Akeel Eduardo (born 10 January 1993) is a Dutch professional basketball player, who last played for Apollo Amsterdam of the Dutch Basketball League (DBL). Born on Sint Maarten, Eduardo usually plays at the shooting guard or small forward position.

References

1993 births
Living people
BSW (basketball club) players
Apollo Amsterdam players
Dutch Basketball League players
Dutch men's basketball players
Shooting guards
Small forwards